The Philippines' Land Management Bureau (abbreviated as LMB), is an agency of the Philippine government under the Department of Environment and Natural Resources responsible for administering, surveying, managing, and disposing Alienable and Disposable (A&D) lands and other government lands not placed under the jurisdiction of other government agencies.

History

The agency was founded on September 2, 1901 by virtue of Act No. 218 as the Insular Bureau of Public Lands (IBPL). William Tipton was named as its first head. The Bureau was tasked to have a survey of the archipelago through Act No. 926.

See also
 Department of Environment and Natural Resources
 Laguna Lake Development Authority
 National Mapping and Resource Information Authority
 National Water Resources Board

References

External links

LMB homepage

Department of Environment and Natural Resources (Philippines)
1901 establishments in the Philippines
Organizations established in 1901